Kerwad (H) is a village in Uttara Kannada in the southwestern India state of Karnataka.

History
Kerwad Mango is very famous across the district and majority mangos sold in the near by market like Haliyal, Dandeli, Dharwad & Hubli. There are a substantial amount of Chardo families in this area as they had migrated due to the persecution of the Portuguese in Goa.

There is one of the famous deity God Siddappa around 3 KM from Kerwad towards East and the deity is situated below a big old tree.

Language
Kannada is the most spoken language here along with Konkani. Konkani is spoken as it is in close proximity to Goa, and many Goans settled in Kerwad when they migrated from Goa.

References

Villages in Uttara Kannada district